Cherri may refer to:

Agustina Cherri, Argentine actress
Ali Cherri, Lebanese artist
Cherri Gilham, British actress
Cherri M. Pancake, American academic